Mind Game (Chinese: 心迷) is a Singaporean crime drama produced by Mediacorp Channel 8, produced by its Malaysian subsidiary MediaCorp Studios Malaysia. The show aired at 9pm on weekdays and had a repeat telecast at 8am the following day. This drama involves many plot twists and cases that requires strong thinking to solve the cases. This drama stars Tay Ping Hui, Joanne Peh, Zhang Yaodong and Paige Chua.

Plot
The drama contains many cases which has unexpected twists and suspense. On every cases, a paralegal, a police, a psychologist and a mysterious woman with the ability to predict the future will help and solve difficult cases. Liang Wenjie is a paralegal with a sharp mind and he is determined to find his long-lost sister who turned out to be dead. While finding his long-lost sister, he met Feng Xuezhi who helped him with many things.

Guo Yongyan, a psychologist, met Zhao Anni and helped each other in cases. Together, four of them remain successful in solving cases until they realize a traitor among four of them...

Cast

Main Cast

 Tay Ping Hui as Liang Wenjie. A paralegal who helps in solving cases.
 Joanne Peh as Zhao Anni A policewoman
 Zhang Yaodong as Guo Yongyan, a psychologist
 Paige Chua as Feng Xuezhi, a woman with a supernatural ability to predict the future 
 Vivian Liu as Liang Huixin

Supporting Cast

Awards & Nominations
Mind Game was nominated for only one technical award category in Star Awards 2016. Ng Lai Huat was nominated for Best Director, but lost to Loh Woon Woon from The Dream Makers II.

See also
List of programmes broadcast by Mediacorp Channel 8
List of Mind Game episodes

References

Singapore Chinese dramas
2015 Singaporean television series debuts
2015 Singaporean television series endings
Channel 8 (Singapore) original programming